"I'm Tired" is a song by English singer Labrinth and American singer Zendaya, released as a single from the season two soundtrack of American TV series Euphoria on 28 February 2022. It was written by Labrinth, Zendaya and the series' creator and director Sam Levinson, and released following the season two finale. The song was also included on the season two score alongside an extended solo version with just Labrinth, and a Zendaya version called "Rue's I'm Tired". At the 74th Primetime Emmy Awards, the song was nominated for Outstanding Original Music and Lyrics.

Background
The "gospel-inspired" song was first used in the fourth episode of season two, in which the character Rue (Zendaya) imagines herself in church.

Charts

Release history

References

2022 singles
2022 songs
Labrinth songs
Song recordings produced by Labrinth
Songs from television series
Songs written by Labrinth
Zendaya songs